ZR-7: The Red House Seven is a Nigerian drama film written, directed and produced by the duo of Olufemi D. Ogunsanwo & Udoka Oyeka; starring Norbert Young, Ayinla O. Abdulakeem, Yakubu Abashiya, Adeyemi Okanlawon, Rilwan Mohammed, Ife Komolafe and Udoka Oyeka. The film was nominated for an African Academy award at the 2012 African Movie Academy Awards.

Plot
The story is a classic life of boarding school adventure involving TJ with six of his friends while in 7th grade. The boys are initially shocked by all the hoops they have to jump in order to survive teachers, prefects, wicked seniors, dining hall food, thieves, cutting grass, washing toilets and all the other regular experiences anyone in a public Nigerian boarding school would experience. But when TJ and the boys accidentally see a man and two female students in a compromising position, what they do with that information is not their only problem in school, but the resulting scandal would change their lives far beyond their wildest dreams.

Cast
Norbert Young - Minister of Education
Ayinla O. Abdulakeem - Little TJ
Yakubu Abashiya - Victor Essien
Rilwan Mohammed - Rolly D
Ife Komolafe - Vicky
Adeyemi Okanlawon - Mr Alabi
Udoka Oyeka - Older TJ
Bakare Mubarak - Toks

References

External links

Production company website

Naija Pals

2011 films
Nigerian drama films
English-language Nigerian films
2010s English-language films
Films directed by Udoka Oyeka